Thyrocopa nihoa is a moth of the family Xyloryctidae. It was first described by Matthew J. Medeiros in 2009. It is endemic to Nihoa in the Northwestern Hawaiian Islands.

The length of the forewings is about 7 mm. Adults are on wing at least in August and September. The ground color of the forewings is brown with a few darker and lighter scales scattered throughout. The discal area is clouded with poorly defined blackish spots in the cell. There is a curving poorly defined whitish band running through the terminal area and evenly spaced spots on the distal half of the costa and along the termen at the vein endings. The hindwings are very light brown, except the anal margin, where faint spots are sometimes visible. The fringe is very light brown.

A reared specimen made a cocoon of thin white silk into which it incorporated a large and varied amount of debris. Included are numerous pellets of Lepidoptera frass, several kinds of plant parts and fragments, parts of dead insects, cast larval skins of insects, the larval cases of two species of Hyposmocoma, and representatives of terrestrial Mollusca of the families Tornatellinidae and Endodontidae.

Etymology
The name nihoa refers to Nihoa, the only locality where this moth occurs.

External links

Thyrocopa
Endemic moths of Hawaii
Moths described in 2009